Judy Upton (born 1967) is a British playwright.

Life
She collaborated with Lisa Goldman at The Red Room Theatre Company.
She also wrote radio plays for the BBC.

Ashes and Sand has been adapted into film.

Awards
1994 George Devine Award, for Ashes and Sand

Works
Everlasting Rose, Old Red Lion Theatre, London, 1992
Ashes And Sand, Royal Court Theatre Upstairs, London, 1994
Bruises, Royal Court Theatre Upstairs, London, 1995
The Shorewatchers' House, The Red Room Theatre (first production), London, 1995
Temple, Orange Tree, Richmond, 1995
Stealing Souls, The Red Room Theatre, London, 1996
Sunspots, The Red Room Theatre, London, 1996
People On The River, The Red Room at the Finborough, London, 1997
To Blusher With Love, The Man In The Moon/Worthing Ritz, 1997
Confidence, Birmingham Rep, Birmingham, 1998
The Girlz, Orange Tree, Richmond, 1998
Know Your Rights, The Red Room at Battersea Arts Centre, 1998
Pig In The Middle, Y Touring Theatre Company, Schools tour and the House of Commons, 1998
The Ballad Of A Thin Man, Channel Theatre Company Spring Tour, 2000
Hotmail From Helsinki, Vienna English Theatre, 2001
Sliding With Suzanne, Royal Court Theatre Upstairs, London, 2001
Team Spirit, Theatre Royal, Plymouth, 2002
My Imprisoned Heart, short film, 2007
Noctropia, Hampstead Theatre, London, 2009

Bibliography
Judy Upton Plays, Methuen Drama (24 Jan 2002),

References

External links
Artist's website

British dramatists and playwrights
1967 births
Living people